Robert Miller Pittenger (born August 15, 1948) is a businessman and American politician who was the U.S. representative for North Carolina's 9th congressional district from 2013 to 2019. The district included several outer portions of Charlotte as well as many of that city's southern and eastern suburbs. He is a member of the Republican Party.

Early life, education, and business career
Pittenger was born in Texas and attended the University of Texas. After graduating he worked for Campus Crusade for Christ before moving to Charlotte in 1985 and becoming a real estate investor.

North Carolina Senate (2003–2007)

Elections
After redistricting, Pittenger decided to run for the 40th senate district of the North Carolina General Assembly in 2002. He defeated Democratic State Senator Fountain Odom 55%–43%. In 2004 he ran for the 39th senate district and defeated Libertarian nominee Andy Grum 89%–11%. In 2006, he won reelection to a third term unopposed.

Tenure
Pittenger represented the state's 39th Senate district, which included portions of southeastern Mecklenburg County. He was a lead sponsor of Right To Life legislation and supported the North Carolina marriage amendment, although he was not in office when the amendment passed out of committee and was finally voted on by the North Carolina General Assembly in 2011.

In May 2004, he proposed cutting the state's corporate tax from 6.9% to 4.9% and the income tax rate for the state's top earners from 8.25% to 7.5%. He also proposed over $1.5 billion in spending cuts, with a focus on reducing Medicaid access for persons above the age of Medicare eligibility. 
 
In February 2005, he proposed a medical malpractice bill that would cap non-economic damages at $250,000 for physicians, hospitals, and long-term care facilities.

Committee assignments
 Appropriations/Base Budget
 Commerce
 Finance
 Insurance and Civil Justice Reform
 Pensions & Retirement and Aging
 Rules and Operation

2008 lieutenant gubernatorial bid

Pittenger defeated three other candidates in the Republican primary on May 6, 2008, becoming his party's nominee for Lieutenant Governor of North Carolina with 59% of the vote. On May 27, 2008, he resigned from the Senate to focus on his campaign. He lost the general election to fellow State Senator, Democrat Walter H. Dalton, 51%–46%.

U.S. House of Representatives (2013–2019)

Elections
2012

After Sue Myrick announced her retirement as the Representative of North Carolina's 9th congressional district in early 2012, Pittenger announced that he would run to replace her. He failed to win the primary outright on May 8, 2012, but finished first with 32% of the vote in the 11-candidate field. In the primary runoff election held on July 17, he defeated former Mecklenburg County Sheriff Jim Pendergraph, 53%–47%.

Pittenger won the general election on November 6, defeating Democratic Mecklenburg County Commission Chairwoman Jennifer Roberts, 52%–47%. He lost the district's share of Mecklenburg County (47%), but ran up huge margins in the Union (63%) and Iredell (64%) portions of the district. It was the closest a Republican had come to losing the district since 1986. He took office in January 2013.

On December 2, 2013, Pittenger introduced the Kilah Davenport Child Protection Act of 2013, which became . The law broadens the coverage of current laws that address domestic assaults by certain repeat offenders. It also requires the United States Department of Justice to write a report on child abuse prevention laws in all U.S. states and territories, "with a particular focus on penalties for cases of severe child abuse."

2014

Pittenger considered running for the U.S. Senate but instead ran for reelection to the House. In the Republican primary, he defeated Michael Steinberg, a candidate for the seat in 2012. No Democrat filed to run for the seat, making this district the only one in the state not contested by both major parties in 2014. There was an unsuccessful write-in campaign for candidate Shawn Eckles of Iredell County.

2016

The 9th was significantly redrawn after a federal court threw out the previous map as an unconstitutional racial gerrymander. It was pushed well to the east, stretching from southeast Charlotte all the way to Fayetteville and the Sandhills.

Baptist pastor Mark Harris challenged Pittenger in the 2016 Republican congressional primary, losing that contest by 134 votes. Pittenger defeated Christian Cano in the general election.

2018

Pittenger faced Mark Harris in a rematch of the 2016 Republican primary. On May 8, 2018, Harris defeated Pittenger with 48.5 percent of the vote to Pittenger's 46.2 percent, although allegations were later raised about illegal activities by the Harris campaign. Pittenger was the first congressional incumbent to lose his primary election in 2018; the second was Mark Sanford.

Harris was the apparent winner in the November 2018 general election, but the result was not certified due to credible allegations of electoral fraud and he was never seated in Congress. As a result, a new special election was called. Pittenger (and also Harris) declined to run in the special election.

Committee assignments
 Committee on Financial Services
 Subcommittee on Financial Institutions and Consumer Credit
 Subcommittee on Monetary Policy and Trade
 Republican Study Committee

Caucus memberships
 United States Congressional International Conservation Caucus
U.S.-Japan Caucus

Political positions

The American Conservative Union gave him a lifetime Congressional evaluation of 90%.

Environment 
Pittenger rejects the scientific consensus on climate change. In 2006, he sent a book called The Skeptical Environmentalist,  published in 1998, to his colleagues in the North Carolina Senate.

Health care 
Pittenger supported the American Health Care Act of 2017 (AHCA), which would repeal the Patient Protection and Affordable Care Act (ACA), also known as Obamacare. On May 2, 2017, Pittenger defended a provision of AHCA that allowed states to end requirements that insurers cannot discriminate against individuals with pre-existing conditions. Pittenger said that Americans who have or develop pre-existing conditions "should just move" to a state without the waiver.

National defense
Pittenger voted for the two-year budget plan that became law on February 9, 2018, citing the lack of options to increase military spending to provide for required training and maintenance.

Controversies

Conflict of interest
Pittenger has been accused of using his position as a state senator to benefit himself in a series of land deals.

Racist remarks
On September 22, 2016, in the wake of protests over the shooting of Keith Lamont Scott, Pittenger said that the violence in Charlotte stemmed from protesters who "hate white people because white people are successful and they're not." The remark drew immediate international condemnation as racist. Fellow North Carolina congressman G. K. Butterfield called the remark "devastatingly ignorant and divisive." Pittenger apologized, saying that his "intent was to discuss the lack of economic mobility for African Americans because of failed policies."

Electoral history

Personal life
Pittenger lives in South Charlotte. He is married to Suzanne Pittenger. He has four children.

References

External links 

 
 
 

|-

|-

1948 births
21st-century American politicians
Candidates in the 2008 United States elections
Living people
Republican Party North Carolina state senators
People from Dallas
Politicians from Charlotte, North Carolina
Republican Party members of the United States House of Representatives from North Carolina